Bernard G. Weiss (10 August 1933 – 8 February 2018) was a professor of languages and literature at the University of Utah. He has an extensive publication record and is recognized as one of the foremost scholars in Islamic law, Islamic theology, Islamic philosophy, Islamic political thought, Arab history and Muslim discussions of linguistics and the origin of language.

Life
Weiss received his PhD from Princeton University in 1966.

Bibliography
 Studies in Islamic Law and Society
 Religion and Law: Biblical-judaic and Islamic Perspectives
 Studies in Islamic Legal Theory
 A Survey of Arab History, 1988
 The Spirit of Islamic Law, Athens, Georgia: University of Georgia Press, 1998.
 (ed. with Peri Bearman and Wolfhart Heinrichs) The Law Applied: Contextualizing the Islamic Shari`a, London and New York: I.B. Tauris, 2008.
 The Search for God's Law: Islamic Jurisprudence in the Writings of Sayf al-Din al-Amidi, 2010
 Language in Orthodox Muslim Thought: A Study of "Wad Al-lughah" and Its Development

References

1933 births
2018 deaths
Linguists from the United States
American scholars of Islam
Princeton University alumni
University of Utah faculty